Uzmaston, Boulston and Slebech is a community in Pembrokeshire, Wales, which includes the villages of Uzmaston, Boulston and Slebech, and the Haverfordwest suburb of Cartlett (an area in the western part of Haverfordwest, no longer marked on modern maps).

Formation
The community was formed in 2012 by the amalgamation of the community of Uzmaston and Boulston and the community of Slebech. It is divided into two electoral wards: Uzmaston & Boulston Ward and Slebech Ward.

Operation
There are six councillors for Uzmaston and Boulston Ward and two for Slebech Ward. Community Council meetings, which are open to the public, are held at either Uzmaston Village Hall or The Rhos Village Hall.

Population
The population at formation according to the 2011 census was 712.

Listed buildings
There are 31 listed buildings in the community, including one Grade I (Picton Castle) and three Grade II*.

History
The three principal villages of which the community is made up are all medieval or older. They appear as separate parishes (Osmaston, Boulston and Sleback) on a 1578 parish map of Pembrokeshire. While Haverfordwest (Herfordwest) is on the map, the suburb of Cartlett is not marked.

References

External links
Community Council website

Communities in Pembrokeshire